Benzaiten (shinjitai: 弁才天 or 弁財天; kyūjitai: 辯才天, 辨才天, or 辨財天, lit. "goddess of eloquence"), also simply known as Benten (shinjitai: 弁天; kyūjitai: 辯天 / 辨天), is a Japanese Buddhist goddess who originated mainly from Saraswati, the Hindu goddess of speech, the arts, and learning, with certain traits deriving from the warrior goddess Durga. Worship of Benzaiten arrived in Japan during the sixth through eighth centuries, mainly via Classical Chinese translations of the Golden Light Sutra (Sanskrit: Suvarṇaprabhāsa Sūtra), which has a section devoted to her.

During the medieval period onwards, Benzaiten came to be associated or even conflated with a number of Buddhist and local deities, which include the goddess Kisshōten (the Buddhist version of the Hindu Lakshmi, whose role as goddess of fortune eventually became ascribed to Benzaiten in popular belief), the snake god Ugajin (the combined form of the two being known as 'Uga Benzaiten'), and the kami Ichikishimahime. Due to her status as a water deity, she was also linked with nāgas, dragons, and snakes. Apart from being a patron of music and the arts, she was eventually also worshiped as a bestower of monetary fortune and was reckoned as one of the Seven Lucky Gods (Shichifukujin).

Benzaiten is depicted a number of ways in Japanese art. She is often depicted holding a biwa (a traditional Japanese lute) similar to how Saraswati is depicted with a veena in Indian art, though she may also be portrayed wielding a sword and a wish-granting jewel (cintāmaṇi). An iconographic formula showing Benzaiten with eight arms holding a variety of weapons (based on the Golden Light Sutra) meanwhile is believed to derive from Durga's iconography. As Uga Benzaiten, she may also be shown with Ugajin (a human-headed white snake) above her head. Lastly, she is also portrayed (albeit rarely) with the head of a snake or a dragon.

Overview

Saraswati in Buddhism

The goddess Saraswati (Sanskrit: Sarasvatī; Pali: Sarassatī) was originally in the Rigveda a river goddess, the deification of the Sarasvati River. She was identified with Vach (Skt. Vāc), the Vedic goddess of speech, and from there became considered to be the patron of music and the arts, knowledge, and learning. In addition to their association with eloquence and speech, both Saraswati and Vach also show warrior traits: Saraswati for instance was called the "Vritra-slayer" (Vṛtraghnī) in the Rigveda (6.61.7) and was associated with the Maruts. She was also associated with the Ashvins, with whom she collaborates to bolster Indra's strength by telling him how to kill the asura Namuchi. In a hymn in Book 10 of the Rigveda (10.125.6), Vach declares: "I bend the bow for Rudra that his arrow may strike and slay the hater of devotion. I rouse and order battle for the people, and I have penetrated Earth and Heaven."

Saraswati, like many other deities of the Hindu pantheon, was eventually adopted into Buddhism, figuring mainly in Mahayana texts. In the 15th chapter of Yijing's translation of the Sutra of Golden Light (Suvarṇaprabhāsa Sūtra) into Classical Chinese (Taishō Tripitaka 885), Saraswati (大辯才天女, pinyin: Dàbiàncáitiānnǚ; Japanese: Daibenzaitennyo, lit. "great goddess of eloquence") appears before the Buddha's assembly and vows to protect all those who put their faith in the sutra, recite it, or copy it. In addition, she promises to increase the intelligence of those who recite the sutra so that they will be able to understand and remember various dharanis. She then teaches the assembly various mantras with which one can heal all illnesses and escape all manner of misfortune. One of the Buddha's disciples, the brahmin Kaundinya, then praises Saraswati, comparing her to Vishnu's consort Narayani (Lakshmi) and declaring that she can manifest herself not only as a benevolent deity, but also as Yami, the sister of Yama. He then describes her eight-armed form with all its attributes — bow, arrow, sword, spear, axe, vajra, iron wheel, and noose.

It has been observed that Kaudinya's paean to Saraswati in Yijing's translation is derived from the Āryāstava ("praise of she who is noble"), a hymn uttered by Vishnu to the goddess Nidra (lit. "Sleep", one of the names applied to Durga) found in the Harivamsha. As the Golden Light Sutra is mainly concerned with the protection of the state, it is not surprising that the fierce, weapon-wielding Durga, who was widely worshiped by rulers and warriors alike for success in battle, provides the model for the appearance assumed by Saraswati, characterized as a protectress of the Buddhist Dharma, in the text. Bernard Faure notes, "[t]he emergence of a martial Sarasvatī may also have obeyed a more fundamental structural logic, inasmuch as Vāc, the Vedic goddess of speech, had already displayed martial characteristics. [...] Already in the Vedas, it is said that she destroys the enemies of the gods, the asuras. Admittedly, later sources seem to omit or downplay that aspect of her powers, but this does not mean that its importance in religious practice was lost."

Saraswati is also briefly mentioned in the esoteric Vairochanabhisambodhi Sutra (Taishō Tripitaka 848) as one of the divinities of the western quarter of the Outer Vajra section (外金剛部院, Jp. Gekongōbu-in) of the Womb Realm Mandala along with Prithvi, Vishnu (Narayana), Skanda (Kumara), Vayu, Chandra, and their retinue. The text later also describes the veena as Saraswati's symbol. The Chinese translation of this sutra renders her name variously as 辯才 (Ch. Biàncái; Jp. Benzai, lit. "eloquence"), 美音天 (Ch. Měiyīntiān; Jp. Bionten, "goddess of beautiful sounds"), and 妙音天 (Ch. Miàoyīntiān; Jp. Myōonten, "goddess of wonderful sounds"). Saraswati in the Womb Realm Mandala is portrayed with two arms holding a veena and situated between Narayana's consort Narayani and Skanda (shown riding on a peacock).

Benzaiten as a kami
Benzaiten is a female kami to Shinto with the name . She is also believed by Tendai Buddhists to be the essence of the kami Ugajin, whose effigy she sometimes carries on her head together with a torii (see photo above). As a consequence, she is sometimes also known as  Benzaiten or Uga Benten.

Bīja and mantra

Benzaiten's mantra meanwhile is as follows:

Temples and Shrines
Benten-dō is the name for a Buddhist temple to Benzaiten, as well as often being the name for Shinto shrines dedicated to her. 

Benzaiten is enshrined on numerous locations throughout Japan; for example, the Enoshima Island in Sagami Bay, the Chikubu Island in Lake Biwa and the Itsukushima Island in Seto Inland Sea (Japan's Three Great Benzaiten Shrines); and she and a five-headed dragon are the central figures of the Enoshima Engi, a history of the shrines on Enoshima written by the Japanese Buddhist monk Kōkei (皇慶) in 1047. According to Kōkei, Benzaiten is the third daughter of the dragon-king of Munetsuchi (無熱池; literally "lake without heat"), known in Sanskrit as Anavatapta, the lake lying at the center of the world according to an ancient Buddhist cosmological view.

Ryōhō-ji, also known as the "Moe Temple," enshrines Benzaiten. It is famous for anime style depictions of Buddhist deities

Benzaiten Buddhist Temples
Hogon-ji Temple (Nagahama City, Shiga Prefecture, Chikubushima, Japan's Three Major Benzaiten)
Daigan-ji Temple (Hyokkaichi City, Hiroshima Prefecture, Miyajima, Japan's three major Bensaiten)
Yaotomi Shrine (Gamagori City, Aichi Prefecture, Takeshima (Aichi Prefecture), Japan Shichibenten)
Enkyo-ji Temple (Himeji City, Hyogo Prefecture, on the day of Kishi every 60 days Uga Benzai Tenyu Shuku is practiced)
Takian-ji Temple (Mino City, Osaka Prefecture)
Shinju-ji Temple (Nishinomiya City, Hyogo Prefecture)
Shinfuku-ji Temple (Tsuyama City, Okayama Prefecture)
Tokai-ji Temple Fuse Benten (Kashiwa City, Chiba Prefecture)
Senso-ji Temple Bentenzan (Taito Ward, Tokyo) [11]
Kanei-ji Temple Shinobazu Pond Benzaiten (Taito Ward, Tokyo, Edo Shichibenten)
Myoko-ji Temple Itsukushima Bensaiten (Ueda City, Nagano Prefecture, Kamehime-sama's dedication)
Togo-ji Temple (Nagoya City, Aichi Prefecture)
Kofuku-ji Temple Kubo Benzaiten (Nara City, Nara Prefecture, in the three-storied pagoda, hidden Buddha)
Ryozen-ji Temple Daibensai Tendo (Nara City, Nara Prefecture)
Chokenji Temple (Fushimi Ward, Kyoto City)
Fukasawa Zenarai Benten (Tonosawa, Hakone-cho, Ashigashimo-gun, Kanagawa Prefecture)
Saifuku-ji Temple (Kagoshima City, Kagoshima Prefecture, Japan's largest wooden Buddha)
Ikko-ji Temple Benten Cave (Inagi City, Tokyo)
Daisei-ji Temple Inokashira Benzaiten (Mitaka City, Tokyo)
Honko-ji Temple, Suse Benzai Kotoku Tenjo (Ichikawa City, Chiba Prefecture)
Hase-dera Bentendo Benten Cave (Kamakura City, Kanagawa Prefecture)
Kaiko-ji Temple, Izumiyama Yutsu Benzaiten (Yamauchi of Senwakuji Temple, Higashiyama Ward, Kyoto City, Kyoto Prefecture, Hachibi statue with Denkyo Daishi Saicho Saku, Hidden Buddha)
Ryōhō-ji Temple Shingo Benzaiten (Hachioji City, Tokyo, dating from 1489, known as "Moe-ji Temple" for it's use of anime style depictions of Buddhist deities)
Momo-ji Temple Naked Benzaiten (2-16 Yotsuya-dori, Chikusa-ku, Nagoya City)
There is a shrine on a floating island protruding in Tanara-numa, Onrin-ji Temple (Oura-cho, Gunma Prefecture).
Eian-ji Temple (Kanazawa City, Ishikawa Prefecture) Enshrined in Bentendo where vermilion Hiten dances with Bishamonten and Daikokuten (opened several times a year)
Myoen-ji Temple Iwaya Reijo Tsuchiya Zeni Benten (Hiratsuka City, Kanagawa Prefecture)
Jushoin Matsumoto Benten (Edogawa-ku, Tokyo)
Hoju-in Kaiun Suzusato-saiten (Minato-ku, Tokyo)
Meio-ji Temple (Ibaraki City, Osaka Prefecture, Benten sect headquarters)
Nyoi-ji Temple (the head temple of the Benten sect in Gojo City, Nara Prefecture, Gyoki Bodhisattva is said to have been carved in the Nara period)

Benzaiten Shinto Shrines
Ejima Shrine (Fujisawa City, Kanagawa Prefecture, Enoshima, Japan's three major Benzaiten)
Zeniarai Benzaiten Ugafuku Shrine (Kamakura City, Kanagawa Prefecture)
Shimizu Benzaitensha (Saku City, Nagano Prefecture)
Tenkawa Daibenzaitensha (Tenkawa-mura, Yoshino-gun, Nara Prefecture, Japan's three major Benzaiten) [Note 6]
Koganeyama Shrine (Ishinomaki City, Miyagi Prefecture, Mt. Kinka)
Benzaiten is also enshrined as Ichikishima Hime-no-Mikoto at the Munakata Taisha shrine.

See also
Daikokuten
Vaiśravaṇa
Dakini
Buddhist Tenbu (天部) deities
Hinduism in Japan
Seven Lucky Gods
Shinbutsu-shūgō
Three Great Shrines of Benzaiten

References

Bibliography

External links

 A Study of the Enoshima Engi
Sacred Texts account of Benzaiten

Arts goddesses
Biwa players
Buddhist goddesses
Commerce goddesses
Abundance goddesses
Fortune goddesses
Japanese dragons
Japanese goddesses
Knowledge goddesses
Sea and river goddesses
Water goddesses 
Shinbutsu shūgō
Shinto kami
Wisdom goddesses
Buddhism in the Meiji period
Music and singing goddesses
Twenty-Four Protective Deities